Jinxiu Road is a station on Line 7 of the Shanghai Metro.

Railway stations in Shanghai
Shanghai Metro stations in Pudong
Railway stations in China opened in 2009
Line 7, Shanghai Metro